Rysa Walker is an American science fiction writer. Her first book, Timebound, won the Amazon Breakthrough Novel Award in 2013. Since then, she has published two series of novels, along with several short stories and other works.

Early life
Rysa Walker was born in Pensacola, Florida. She lived in several different cities and towns in Florida before finally settling in Wewahitchka, Florida when she was 10 years old. When discussing where her passion for writing came from in an interview in 2014, Walker said, "I've been writing since I was a little kid. Most of the jobs I've held have involved some sort of writing, as well." Walker moved away from Florida when she was seventeen years old.

For graduate school, Walker attended the University of North Carolina at Chapel Hill, and received a PhD in Political Science.

Career
On October 1, 2012, Walker published her first novel, Time's Twisted Arrow, which was a 351-page novel that was published with the help of Kindle Direct Publishing.

In January 2013, Walker decided to enter Time's Twisted Arrow into the Amazon Breakthrough Novel Award contest, a book contest pitting 10,000 self-published and unpublished novels with a grand prize of $50,000 and a publishing contract being given to the winner of the contest, and a prize of $15,000 and a publishing contract being given to the four other finalists. Amazon had changed a lot of the prizes and awards from previous years, as previously the grand prize winner would receive only $15,000.

On May 21, 2013, it was announced that Time's Twisted Arrow was a finalist for the 2013 award and that now, owing to Amazon's official rights over much of the marketing of the book, it would be called Timebound instead of Time's Twisted Arrow. Also, a new cover was released for Timebound. On June 15, 2013, it was announced that Timebound had won the Amazon Breakthrough Novel Award and that Walker would receive the grand prize, along with a contract with Skyscape Publishing, an Amazon Publishing imprint.

After she won the award, Walker quit her day job working as a professor at the University of Maryland University College so that she could focus full-time on writing.

Timebound, the first novel in the Chronos Files series, was released on December 1, 2013, for Kindle users through the use of the Kindle First program, and was released in print on January 1, 2014.

Timebound is widely considered to be a science fiction and Young adult fiction novel with a focus on time travel. In the novel, 17-year-old Kate Pierce-Keller has to deal with sudden time shifts that cause members of her family to vanish. She figures out that she is the only one who can rescue half of the world's population from a religious group called the Cyrists, led by a man named Saul, who is the genetic grandfather of Kate and is planning on altering the timeline to serve his vile purposes.

As a result of the initial success of Timebound, Walker released a novella on April 25, 2014, called Time's Echo. It was released to provide some background information on some of the events that occurred behind the storyline of Timebound. Since the release of Time's Echo, Walker has released several other novellas that have been written for the purpose of giving her readers additional information about the characters and events in her novels.

On October 21, 2014, Walker released Time's Edge, the second novel in the Chronos Files series. On October 20, 2015, Walker released Time's Divide, which is the third and final novel in the Chronos Files series.

On October 11, 2016, Walker released The Delphi Effect, which is the first book in her second series, The Delphi Trilogy. It is often considered to be a work of Young adult fiction and paranormal fiction. In the novel, seventeen-year-old Anna Morgan, the main character, has a mental condition in which she picks up mental hitchhikers unwillingly. When she picks up the spirit of a girl who has been brutally murdered, Anna starts to obtain information regarding a potential government conspiracy. The novel primarily focuses on Anna and how she reacts to the new knowledge that she has gained, along with the events that have been occurring around her that have evoked her into action. The second book in The Delphi Trilogy is entitled The Delphi Resistance. It was released on October 24, 2017. The third and final book in The Delphi Trilogy, The Delphi Revolution, was released on October 9, 2018.

Walker's first book in the Chronos Origins series, Now, Then, and Everywhen, was made available to Kindle First users on March 1, 2020. It will be released in print on April 1, 2020.

For each of Walker's novels and her novellas, audiobooks have been released on Audible.com. Timebounds audio book was released on January 1, 2014, the same day as its official publication, and was narrated by Kate Rudd. The audiobooks for Time's Edge, Time's Divide, and The Delphi Effect were also narrated by Rudd. Time's Echo'''s audiobook was released on June 12, 2014, and was narrated by Nick Podehl. Some of her more recent novellas have been narrated by Podehl, whereas others have been narrated by Rudd.

Works
Novels and novellas
The Chronos Files seriesTimebound (December 1, 2013) (formerly Time's Twisted Arrow)Time's Echo (May 25, 2014) – NovellaTime's Edge (October 21, 2014)Time's Mirror (June 30, 2015) – NovellaTime's Divide (October 20, 2015)Simon Says (December 18, 2015) – Novella

The Delphi Trilogy seriesThe Delphi Effect (October 11, 2016)The Delphi Resistance (October 24, 2017)The Delphi Revolution (October 9, 2018)

The Chronos Origins seriesNow, Then, and Everywhen (April 1, 2020)Red, White, and the Blues (January 19, 2021)Bell, Book, and Key (November 16, 2021)

Short Stories
Chronos StoriesWhack Job (June 17, 2016)2092 (June 18, 2016)The Gambit (June 18, 2016)

Comics
The Chronos Files seriesTime Trial #1 (July 20, 2016)Time Trial #2 (August 17, 2016)Time Trial #3'' (September 14, 2016)

Personal life
Walker currently lives in Cary, North Carolina.

References

American science fiction writers
American women novelists
Women science fiction and fantasy writers
People from Pensacola, Florida
People from Wewahitchka, Florida
People from Cary, North Carolina
1961 births
Living people
21st-century American women